A list of lists of townlands in County Cork, Ireland by barony: there are approximately 5,580 townlands.

Townland lists
 List of townlands of the barony of Bantry in County Cork
 List of townlands of the barony of Barretts in County Cork
 List of townlands of the barony of Barrymore in County Cork
 List of townlands of the barony of Bear in County Cork
 List of townlands of the barony of Condons & Clangibbon in County Cork
 List of townlands of the barony of Cork in County Cork
 List of townlands of the barony of Courceys in County Cork
 List of townlands of the barony of Duhallow in County Cork
 List of townlands of the barony of East Carbery (E.D.) in County Cork
 List of townlands of the barony of East Carbery (W.D.) in County Cork
 List of townlands of the barony of East Muskerry in County Cork
 List of townlands of the barony of Fermoy in County Cork
 List of townlands of the barony of Ibane and Barryroe in County Cork
 List of townlands of the barony of Imokilly in County Cork
 List of townlands of the barony of Kerrycurrihy in County Cork
 List of townlands of the barony of Kinalea in County Cork
 List of townlands of the barony of Kinalmeaky in County Cork
 List of townlands of the barony of Kinnatalloon in County Cork
 List of townlands of the barony of Kinsale in County Cork
 List of townlands of the barony of Orrery and Kilmore in County Cork
 List of townlands of the barony of West Carbery (E.D.) in County Cork
 List of townlands of the barony of West Carbery (W.D.) in County Cork
 List of townlands of the barony of West Muskerry in County Cork

References